Koblenz Hauptbahnhof is a railway station in the city of Koblenz in the German state of Rhineland-Palatinate. It is the focal point of rail transport in the Rhine-Moselle-Lahn area. It is a through station in southern Koblenz built below Fort Großfürst Konstantin and opened in 1902 in the Neustadt (new city), which was built after the demolition of the city walls in 1890. The station replaced two former stations on the Left Rhine railway, which were only 900 m apart, and the former Moselle line station. Koblenz-Stadtmitte station opened in April 2011 in the old centre of Koblenz. Koblenz Hauptbahnhof is on the West Rhine Railway and connects to the Moselle line, the East Rhine Railway and to the Lahntal railway. It is used daily by about 40,000 travelers and visitors.  In the station forecourt are a bus station and a pavilion.

Since 2002, the station has been part of the Upper Middle Rhine Valley UNESCO World Heritage site.

History

Rhenish railway station 

The Bonn-Cologne Railway Company opened its line between Cologne and Bonn in 1844, and extended it to Rolandseck in 1856. This company was taken over by the Rhenish Railway Company in 1857, which extended the line to Koblenz in 1858. On 11 November 1858, the first train, hauled by the locomotive Windsbraut ("whirlwind") ran over the newly built Moselle railway bridge on the Left Rhine line to a provisional station on Fischelstraße. The construction of the bridge and the line was made possible by the first demolition of the Prussian city walls.

In 1859, the route was extended from Koblenz to Bingerbrück and the Rhenish station was expanded. In 1864 the Pfaffendorf Bridge was opened over the Rhine in Koblenz. It was initially built for trains only, connecting the Left and the Right Rhine lines. The last trains crossed the Pfaffendorf Bridge at the beginning of the First World War in August 1914.

Moselle station 
In October 1878 the Güls railway bridge was inaugurated on the Moselle line and a year later this was followed by the completion of the Horchheim rail bridge over the Rhine. In 1879, the Moselle line was put into operation and its station (Moselbahnhof) was opened below Fort Konstantin, near the modern Hauptbahnhof. This line completed the expansion of the Koblenz rail network and was also a section of the strategic railway line between Berlin and Metz, the so-called Cannons Railway (Kanonenbahn).

Construction of the railway station 

The Prussian fortifications of Koblenz were abandoned and torn down completely from 1890. The built up area of the city spread outside the small area inside the old walls for the first time. South of the walls a new urban area rapidly grew up along with the southern suburbs. The maintenance of two stations proved to be very complicated, because through trains had to stop twice within 900 m and passengers coming from Trier and wanting to travel on the right Rhine line to the north had to take a horse-drawn cab or walk between the Moselle and the Rhenish station. Thus demands for a central station became louder and planning started on the construction of a new and larger passenger station.

The small Rhenish station on Fischelstraße was abandoned and a magnificent new station was built in the new southern suburbs near the Moselle station from 1899 to 1902 to a design by Fritz Klingholz. The Central Station (Centralbahnhof), as it was officially called at that time, was opened on 1 May 1902. The through station was built like a palace with central and side pavilions, although for functional reasons it was not completely symmetrical. The facades were made of tuff and yellow sandstone in a neo-baroque style. The station building has a length of 96 m. A hall was built over the platforms. The northern wing of the royal room (Fürstenzimmer) was richly decorated and had direct access via a flight of stairs to platform 1, on which the Emperor arrived in Koblenz in 1905.

After the Second World War 
The station building and the railway tracks were damaged in air raids during the Second World War. Reconstruction began in 1946. The station lost the hall structure over its platforms and its tower building. The reconstructions were different from the original buildings, simply built and without ornamentation. Functional roofs were installed over the platforms. In 1957 the Rhine line was electrified. In 1967 a new railway station signal box was opened and in 1977 the lobby was renovated. The travel centre was opened in 1984. In 1998 renovation of the station began and it is still continuing.

Train services 

Koblenz station has a total of ten platform tracks on four platforms, seven of which are through-tracks (1 to 5, 8 and 9) and three of which are terminal tracks (104, 105 and 109).

Trains on the Left Rhine line from the north can use almost all tracks (1 to 5, 8 and 104), while Mosel line trains only use the three western tracks (5, 8 and 9). Trains on the Left Rhine line from the south can use only the eastern tracks (1 to 5 and 105), while Lahntal railway and Right Rhine line trains can use all tracks (apart from the northern terminal platform, 104).

Long distance traffic

In long-distance traffic, Koblenz is served by Intercity-Express, Intercity and EuroCity trains. Thus, almost every major city in Germany can be reached directly from Koblenz. Some services on lines 30, 31, 32 and 35 are now operated with ICE rolling stock and are therefore considered to be ICE services. In due course, DB intends all IC services to be operated by ICE trains, some limited to 160 km/h, the maximum operating speed of the West Rhine line.

Regional services
Regional services consist of Regional-Express and Regionalbahn trains to cities within 200 kilometres towards Saarbrücken, Cologne and the Ruhr, Emmerich / Wesel, Giessen and  Mainz-Frankfurt am Main. Only 3 of the 12 lines continue through the station, the VIAS-operated RheingauLinie (RB10), the trans regio-operated Mittelrheinbahn (RB26) and the DB Regio-operated Lahn-Eifel-Bahn (RB23); the rest start or finish there.

References

Sources

External links 

Hauptbahnhof
Railway stations in Germany opened in 1902